The 2014 season was the Miami Dolphins' 45th in the National Football League (NFL), their 49th overall and their third under head coach Joe Philbin. Following the appointment of Dennis Hickey, the team had a new general manager for the first time since 2007 after Jeff Ireland was fired on January 7, 2014. The Dolphins equaled their 8–8 record from 2013 and missed the playoffs for a sixth consecutive season.

2014 draft

Draft trades
 The Dolphins traded their original second-round selection (No. 50 overall) to the San Diego Chargers in exchange for the Chargers' second- and fourth-round selections — Nos. 57 and 125 overall. The Dolphins later traded the No. 57 selection to the San Francisco 49ers in exchange for the 49ers' second- (No. 63 overall) and fifth- (No. 171 overall) round selections.
 The Dolphins traded their original third- (No. 81 overall) and fourth- (No. 116 overall) round selections to the Oakland Raiders in exchange for the Raiders' third-round selection (No. 67 overall).

Staff

Final roster

Schedule

Preseason

Regular season

Note: Intra-division opponents are in bold text.

Game summaries

Week 1: vs. New England Patriots

Week 2: at Buffalo Bills

Week 3: vs. Kansas City Chiefs

Week 4: at Oakland Raiders
NFL International Series

Week 6: vs. Green Bay Packers

Week 7: at Chicago Bears

Week 8: at Jacksonville Jaguars

Week 9: vs. San Diego Chargers

Week 10: at Detroit Lions

Week 11: vs. Buffalo Bills

Week 12: at Denver Broncos

Week 13: at New York Jets

Week 14: vs. Baltimore Ravens

Week 15: at New England Patriots

Week 16: vs. Minnesota Vikings

The game's overtime ended when defensive end Terrence Fede blocked a punt to the endzone for a safety. Despite the win, the Dolphins were eliminated from playoff contention after the Steelers beat the Chiefs on the same day.

Week 17: vs. New York Jets

Standings

Division

Conference

References

External links
 

Miami
Miami Dolphins seasons
Miami Dolphins